The Manning, Lee and Moore Law Office is a historic office building at 109 Court Street in Clarendon, Arkansas.  Built in 1895, it has served continuously since then as an office building for lawyers.  It originally stood on 2nd Street opposite the courthouse, and was moved to its present location in 1899, at which time its rear ell was added.  The building features distinctive Queen Anne styling, including a wraparound porch with spindle work and applied Stick style woodwork in the gable.

The building was listed on the National Register of Historic Places in 1984.

See also
National Register of Historic Places listings in Monroe County, Arkansas

References

Office buildings on the National Register of Historic Places in Arkansas
Commercial buildings completed in 1895
Buildings and structures in Monroe County, Arkansas
National Register of Historic Places in Monroe County, Arkansas
Law offices
Legal history of Arkansas